Gordon Steele Brown (21 March 1929 – 15 August 2010) was an English footballer.

Career
Born in Church Warsop, Nottinghamshire, Brown played junior football in Worksop before signing a professional contract with Nottingham Forest in December 1946. He joined York City in June 1950 after serving in the British Army in 1948 to 1949. He was a member of the team which played in the FA Cup semi-final in 1955. He left the club for non-League Sutton United in July 1958 and later played for Shirebrook Miners Welfare. Brown died at Nottingham City Hospital at the age of 81 on the morning of 15 August 2010.

References

1929 births
2010 deaths
People from Warsop
Footballers from Nottinghamshire
English footballers
Association football wing halves
Nottingham Forest F.C. players
York City F.C. players
Sutton United F.C. players
Shirebrook Miners Welfare F.C. players
English Football League players
20th-century British Army personnel